Karen Cecilia Martínez Insignares (born Cartagena, Colombia, August 14, 1979) better known as Karen Martínez, is a Colombian actress and model. She is married to the Colombian singer Juanes.

A model since age 14, Martinez first appeared on television in a commercial for a soda recorded by Carlos Vives in Cartagena.

Biography 
Karen Martínez is married to Colombian singer Juanes. Martínez and Juanes now have two daughters (Paloma Aristizábal Martínez and Luna Aristizábal Martínez) and a son named Dante Aristizábal Martínez.

She has starred in the series "El Cartel de los Sapos" and other telenovelas.

Telenovelas 
 El cartel de los sapos (2008) as Sofia
 Tiempo final (2008) as Candela
 Sofía dame tiempo (2003) as Sofia 
 Amor a Mil (2001) as Diana McKenzie
 Siniestro (2001) as Leah Santos
 Mujeres asesinas Lisa, La Soñadora
 Padres e hijos (2000) as Ximena
 Oki Doki (1992) as Marcelita

References

External links

Colombian telenovela actresses
1979 births
Living people
20th-century Colombian actresses
21st-century Colombian actresses